Rehabilitation Psychology is a quarterly peer-reviewed academic journal and the official journal of Division 22 of the American Psychological Association. The journal was established in 1972 and covers research on the "broader fields of psychology and rehabilitation." The current editor-in-chief is Dawn M. Ehde (University of Washington).

The journal has implemented the Transparency and Openness Promotion (TOP) Guidelines.  The TOP Guidelines provide structure to research planning and reporting and aim to make research more transparent, accessible, and reproducible.

Abstracting and indexing 
The journal is abstracted and indexed by MEDLINE/PubMed and the Social Sciences Citation Index. According to the Journal Citation Reports, the journal has a 2020 impact factor of 2.564.

See also 
 Rehabilitation psychology

References

External links 
 

American Psychological Association academic journals
English-language journals
Clinical psychology journals
Quarterly journals
Publications established in 1972